Charity Ball is the second studio album by the American rock group Fanny, released in July 1971 on Reprise. The album's title track became the group's first top 40 hit.

Background
The album was, like the previous year's debut Fanny, produced by Richard Perry. The songs were all written by the group, with the exception of a cover of Buffalo Springfield's "Special Care". The group experimented with a wider range of musical styles than the first album, including ballads and funk in addition to straightforward rock 'n' roll. The photograph of the band used in the front cover artwork was taken by Candice Bergen.

Critical reception
Music critic Robert Christgau wrote, "This record exploits [drummer Alice de Buhr's] chops and presence, sinking the pop harmonies in a harder, funkier frame. The title tune is a pure raver that oughtabeahit, but almost every song has something--or several somethings--to recommend it."

In a retrospective review, AllMusic's Mark Deming said that Charity Ball, in comparison with the group's first album, is a "stronger, more confident, and more enjoyable disc," writing that "the push and pull between June Millington's tough guitar figures and Nickey Barclay's rollicking keyboards yield more exciting results here." He felt that the band has better songs on Charity Ball, but that the production is "sometimes a bit more polished than this music needed."

Release
The album reached No. 150 on the Billboard 200. The title track was released as a single, reaching No. 40 on the Billboard Hot 100.

Track listing

Personnel
Adapted from the album's liner notes.

Fanny
 June Millington – guitar, vocals
 Jean Millington – bass, vocals
 Nickey Barclay – piano, organ, vocals
 Alice de Buhr – drums, percussion, vocals
Technical
 Richard Perry – producer
 Richard Moore – engineer , remixing 
 Bill Lazarus – engineer, remixing 
 Matt Hyde – engineer 
 Tom Harvey – remixing 
 Dean O. Torrence – album design
 Candice Bergen – cover photo of Fanny
 Kim Tucker – cover photo
 Layton Huber – prop design

References

External links
 Charity Ball - Fanny Rocks (official website)

1971 albums
Fanny (band) albums
Albums produced by Richard Perry
Albums recorded at Sunset Sound Recorders
Reprise Records albums
Albums with cover art by Dean Torrence